A list of Assamese languages films released in the decade of the 1960s. There were 13 movies were released in this decade.

A-Z film

References

External links
rupaliparda.com, an Assamese film website

Assamese
1960s
Assamese